The German Emigration Center is a museum located in Bremerhaven, Germany dedicated to the history of German emigration, especially to the United States. It is Europe's largest theme museum about emigration. Visitors can experience the emigration process through interactive exhibits. The museum also provides access to databases of immigration records.

The museum opened on August 8, 2005.

References

External links
German Emigration Center Website, in German and English

Further reading
 Bade, Klaus J. "From emigration to immigration: The German experience in the nineteenth and twentieth centuries." Central European History 28.4 (1995): 507–535.

Museums in Bremen (state)
Ethnographic museums in Germany
Buildings and structures in Bremerhaven
History museums in Germany
German-American history
German emigrants to the United States
German emigrants
Museums established in 2005
2005 establishments in Germany
Museums of human migration